Stan Wilson (23 January 1928 – 24 January 2002) was  a former Australian rules footballer who played with Richmond in the Victorian Football League (VFL).

Notes

External links 		
		
		
		
		
		

1928 births
2002 deaths
Australian rules footballers from Victoria (Australia)		
Richmond Football Club players